The 2018 Hungarian Open was the first event of the 2018 ITTF World Tour. It took place from 18–21 January in Budapest, Hungary.

Men's singles

Seeds

Draw

Top half

Bottom half

Finals

Women's singles

Seeds

Draw

Top half

Bottom half

Finals

Men's doubles

Seeds

Draw

Women's doubles

Seeds

Draw

References

External links

Tournament page on ITTF website

Hungarian Open (table tennis)
Hungarian Open
2018 in Hungarian sport
Table tennis competitions in Hungary
International sports competitions in Budapest
Hungarian Open